Lillycrop is a surname of English origin. People with that name include:

 George Lillycrop (1886 – after 1944), English football player and manager
 Karen A. Lillycrop (active from 2007), English molecular biologist
 Tom Lillycrop (born 1991), English rugby league player

See also
 

Surnames of English origin